Andrzej Stanisław Badeński (10 May 1943 – 28 September 2008) was a Polish sprinter who specialized in the 400 metres. He won a bronze medal in that event at the 1964 Summer Olympics, and won the gold medal in that event at the European Indoor Championships in 1968 and in 1971.

Career
Badenski was born in Warsaw and represented the club Legia Warszawa. At the 1962 European Championships he finished sixth in the 400 metres. He did however win few international accolades before winning the bronze medal in the 400 metres at the 1964 Olympic Games. At the same Olympics he finished sixth in the 4×400 metres relay together with the Polish team. At the 1966 European Championships he won a silver medal in the 400 metres, only behind Stanislaw Gredzinski, and won the 4×400 metres relay together with Jan Werner, Edmund Borowski and Stanislaw Gredzinski.

After this, his greatest success would come in the regional indoor championships. At the 1967 European Indoor Games he competed in the relay final, but the team did not finish, and at the 1968 European Indoor Games he won a gold medal in the relay. He also won the individual distance at the 1968 European Indoor Games, and two relay gold medals at the 1969 European Indoor Games.

His second Olympic Games were in 1968. He finished seventh in the 400 metres. In the 4×400 metres relay he finished fourth together with Stanislaw Gredzinski, Jan Balachowski and Jan Werner. With the same team members he finished fourth in the relay at the 1969 European Championships. In the individual distance he finished sixth. At the 1970 European Indoor Championships he won two silver medals; in the individual distance as well as in relay. At the 1971 European Indoor Championships he won gold medals in both these events, the latter together with Waldemar Korycki, Jan Werner and Jan Balachowski. With the same team members he won a silver medal in the relay at the 1971 European Championships and a gold medal at the 1972 European Indoor Championships. At the 1972 Olympic Games he reached the semi-final in the 400 metres and finished fifth in the relay.

He became Polish 400 metres champion in 1962, 1963, 1964, 1965 and 1967, and in 1971 he became American indoor champion in the 600 yards event. His personal best time in the 400 metres was 45.42 seconds, achieved in 1968. At the end of his career in 1974 he defected to the West and lived in Germany until his death. He died near Wiesbaden in September 2008.

References

1943 births
2008 deaths
Polish male sprinters
Olympic athletes of Poland
Athletes (track and field) at the 1964 Summer Olympics
Athletes (track and field) at the 1968 Summer Olympics
Athletes (track and field) at the 1972 Summer Olympics
Polish emigrants to Germany
Polish defectors
Legia Warsaw athletes
European Athletics Championships medalists
Medalists at the 1964 Summer Olympics
Olympic bronze medalists for Poland
Olympic bronze medalists in athletics (track and field)
Athletes from Warsaw